Saval is a surname. Notable people with the surname include:

Dany Saval (born 1942), French actress
Manolita Saval (1914–2001), Spanish actress and singer
Manuel Saval (1956–2009), Mexican actor
Nikil Saval, American writer, editor and activist
Paco Saval (born 1950), Chilean musician and composer

See also
Savall (surname)